Mattathias ben Theophilus (died c. 66 CE) was the Jewish High Priest (Kohen Gadol)
 at the start of the Jewish Revolution, and was overthrown by Revolutionary forces.

A minority of scholars believe him to be the same as the Theophilus mentioned in the New Testament books of Luke 1:3 and Acts 1:1.   One author argues that Mattathias ben Theophilus was the father of Josephus.

References

1st-century High Priests of Israel
Year of death unknown
Judean people
Year of birth unknown
People from Jerusalem